"You Can't Take the Honky Tonk Out of the Girl" is a song written by Bob DiPiero and Bart Allmand, and recorded by American country music duo Brooks & Dunn.  It was released in September 2003 as the second single from their album Red Dirt Road.  It reached number 3 in early 2004.

Background and content
The song was inspired by a line from the film Sweet Home Alabama. "I just invented this story about this girl. The model for this story lives in Branson, Missouri, and she's that girl in the song," DiPiero told The Boot. "We just took off on this story and came up with this song. It's got a got a cool Keith Richards/country/rockin' thing that Brooks & Dunn do so well. The song just grew its own wings and flew up the charts."

Composition
This up-tempo song accompanied by electric guitar and horn section is set in the key of F major. It has a main chord progression of F-C-B and a vocal range of D-C.

Music video
The music video was directed by Michael Salomon, and features actress Marilu Henner as the mother of the bride. Filmed in Los Angeles over two days, it begins with a plane touching down beneath the Hollywood sign (except it reads "HonkyTonk" instead of "Hollywood"). The duo are performing the song with their band in front of the sign, with blue strobe lights illuminating the sky. The rest of the video visually retells the song's lyrics, with various subtitles displaying certain aspects of the plot. While the lyrics to the song imply that Connie ran off with the groom, the music video shows Connie dressed as the bride with the real bride and groom having eloped to Cancun, as mentioned in the third verse. It ends with a postscript reading "Dedicated to All Wild Women".

Ronnie Dunn wears a Johnny Cash shirt in the video. Although Dunn had not intended the shirt to be worn as a tribute, Cash died three days before the single's release.

Chart positions
"You Can't Take the Honky Tonk Out of the Girl" debuted at number 60 on the U.S. Billboard Hot Country Singles & Tracks chart for the week of September 20, 2003.

Year-end charts

References

2003 singles
Brooks & Dunn songs
Songs written by Bob DiPiero
Song recordings produced by Mark Wright (record producer)
Arista Nashville singles
Music videos directed by Michael Salomon
2003 songs
Songs about New York City
Songs about Los Angeles